UFC Fight Night: The Korean Zombie vs. Rodríguez (also known as UFC Fight Night 139) was a mixed martial arts event produced by the Ultimate Fighting Championship that was held on November 10, 2018 at Pepsi Center in Denver, Colorado,  United States.

Background 
The UFC celebrated its 25th anniversary at this event, given its first event took place on November 12, 1993, in Denver at the now-demolished McNichols Sports Arena. UFC officials went to a throwback theme for the event, using the original UFC logo, and non-Fox related television graphics were based on the original pay-per-view broadcast.

A featherweight bout between former UFC Lightweight Champion Frankie Edgar and former UFC Featherweight Championship challenger Chan Sung Jung was expected to serve as the event headliner. However on October 26, it was reported that Edgar pulled out due to injury and was replaced by The Ultimate Fighter: Latin America featherweight winner Yair Rodríguez.

Ricardo Ramos was expected to face Ricky Simón at the event. However on October 15, it was reported that Ramos pulled out due to a hand injury, and in turn, Simon was removed from the card as well.

A lightweight bout between Beneil Dariush and Chris Gruetzemacher was expected to take place at the event. However on October 19, it was reported Gruetzemacher withdrew from the event due to undisclosed reasons and was replaced by promotional newcomer Thiago Moisés.

A women's strawweight bout between Maycee Barber and Maia Stevenson was expected to take place at the event. However on October 20, it was reported that Stevenson pulled out from the event due to injury and was replaced by promotional newcomer Hannah Cifers.

A light heavyweight bout between Alonzo Menifield and Saparbek Safarov was expected to take place at the event. However it was reported on October 21 that Safarov pulled out from the event for undisclosed reasons and the bout was scrapped.

Jordan Espinosa was expected to face Mark De La Rosa at the event. However on November 4, it was reported that Espinosa pulled out from the event and was replaced by Joby Sanchez.

A bout between former UFC Flyweight Championship challengers Ray Borg and Joseph Benavidez was expected to take place at the event. However, Borg pulled out on November 7 due to medical issues and the bout was cancelled.

At the weigh-ins, former UFC Women's Bantamweight Championship challenger Raquel Pennington weighed in at 138 lb, 2 pounds over the bantamweight non-title fight limit of 136 lb. She was fined 20 percent of her purse, which went to her opponent former UFC Women's Featherweight Champion Germaine de Randamie and the bout proceeded  at catchweight.

Results

Bonus awards
The following fighters were awarded $50,000 bonuses:
 Fight of the Night: Yair Rodríguez vs. Chan Sung Jung
Performance of the Night: Yair Rodríguez and Donald Cerrone

Aftermath
On June 24, 2020, it was announced that Bobby Moffett's submission win against Chas Skelly was overturned by the Colorado Office of Combative Sports after Skelly appealed the loss due to a referee call. Its stoppage was considered highly controversial at the time, as the referee waved off the fight in the midst of a submission sequence.

See also 
 List of UFC events
 2018 in UFC
 List of current UFC fighters

References 

UFC Fight Night
2018 in mixed martial arts
2018 in sports in Colorado
Sports competitions in Denver
November 2018 sports events in the United States